The Kingdom of Slavonia was a kingdom of the Habsburg monarchy and the Austrian Empire that existed from 1699 to 1868. The kingdom included northern parts of present-day regions of Slavonia (today in Croatia) and Syrmia (today in Serbia and Croatia). The southern parts of these regions were part of the Slavonian Military Frontier, which was a component of the Military Frontier separating the Habsburg monarchy from the Ottoman Empire.

Geography 

The Kingdom of Slavonia was bounded by the Kingdom of Croatia to the west, the Kingdom of Hungary to the north and the east, and the Ottoman Empire to the south. Together with the Slavonian Military Frontier, Slavonia was about 6,600 miles squared in area. It was divided into the three counties of Požega, Virovitica and Syrmia. Besides a chain of mountains in the middle of the province, the remaining part of Slavonian Kingdom consisted of extensive plains and fertile eminences planted with vines and fruit trees.

History 

The Kingdom of Slavonia was formed from territories that the Habsburg monarchy gained from the Ottoman Empire by the Treaty of Karlowitz (1699)  that ended the Great Turkish War. Initially, it was a separate Habsburg land under joint civil-military administration that lasted from 1699 to 1745. The inhabitants were exempted from taxes, but were bound to military service. In 1745, the full civil administration was introduced and Kingdom of Slavonia, as one of the Lands of the Hungarian Crown, was administratively included into both Kingdom of Croatia and Kingdom of Hungary. Following the 1868 Settlement (Nagodba) with the Kingdom of Hungary, Kingdom of Slavonia was joined with Kingdom of Croatia into the single Kingdom of Croatia-Slavonia, which although it was under the suzerainty of the Crown of Saint Stephen kept a significant level of self-rule.

Population 

After the end of the Great Turkish War, Slavonia was left desolated as around 80% of its pre-war population fled. In order to improve its demographics, people that fled from Slavonia and whose property was taken by the Ottomans were allowed to return to their lands if they had valid ownership documents. Settlers from Bosnia also started migrating to Slavonia, fleeing from the Ottomans. In 1691, around 22,300 Catholics from Bosnian Posavina moved to Slavonia. It is estimated that around 40,000 people lived in Slavonia in 1696. In 1698, its population increased to 80,000.

The 1802 Austrian population data for the Kingdom of Slavonia recorded 148,000 (51.6%) Catholics, 135,000 (47.2%) Orthodox and 3,500 (1.2%) Protestants.

According to other statistical estimations, in 1787 in civil Slavonia there were 265,670 inhabitants, and in 1804/1805 there were 286,349 inhabitants, but from that number clergy and nobility were excluded. Only men were counted in that census. There were: 74,671 Roman Catholics, 68,390 Orthodox Christians, 1,744 Calvinists, 97 Lutherans and 160 Jews. Number of Orthodox Christians was higher in Syrmia: 32,090 Orthodox Christians and 12,633 Roman Catholics. In other two counties of Slavonia: Požega and Virovitica, as in city of Požega, Roman Catholics outnumbered Orthodox population.

The official Austrian census of 1857 for Kingdom of Slavonia gives the following results (a section of Syrmia was in 1857 part of the Voivodeship of Serbia and Banat of Temeschwar):

Požega County

 63,341 Roman Catholics
 41,172 Eastern Orthodox
 837 Jews
 629 Greek Catholics
 85 Calvinists
 44 Lutherans

Osijek County

 101,559 Roman Catholics
 35,806 Eastern Orthodox
 4,257 Calvinists
 1,784 Jews
 629 Greek Catholics
 69 Lutherans

Economy 

The Kingdom of Slavonia was mostly an agricultural land, just like the Kingdom of Croatia, and it was known for its silk production. Agriculture and the breeding of cattle were the most profitable occupations of the inhabitants. It produced corn of all kinds, hemp, flax, tobacco, and great quantities of liquorice. The quantity of wine produced was also large, especially in the county of Srem. In 1857 industrial employment (11.01%) was highest in the County of Osijek, while 72.3% were employed in agriculture (82.9% in the Požega County).

See also 

 Kingdom of Croatia (Habsburg)
 Sanjak of Požega
 Slavonian Military Frontier
 Kingdom of Dalmatia
 Timeline of Croatian history
 Slavonia

References

Literature
 
 
 

Former countries in the Balkans
History of Slavonia
Vojvodina under Habsburg rule
History of Syrmia
History of the Serbs of Croatia
Former kingdoms
Croatia under Habsburg rule
1699 establishments in the Habsburg monarchy
1868 disestablishments in Austria-Hungary
Disestablishments in the Kingdom of Hungary (1867–1918)
Former countries
Lands of the Kingdom of Hungary (1867–1918)